The Ponce Limestone is a geologic formation in Puerto Rico. It preserves fossils dating back to the Neogene period (20.45 million years ago (Mya).

Description
Ponce Limestone includes beds of brown clay and has a maximum estimated thickness of 850 meters. It consists mostly of yellowish-orange, soft to moderately hard, fossiliferous limestone and appears almost continuously as a narrow band extending from Bahía Montalva in Patillas to Río Pastillo, in Barrio Canas.

Deposits
Exposed in the Ponce, Río Descalabrado, Punta Cucharas, Yauco, Punta Verraco, Guanica, La Parguera, San German, and Cabo Rojo quadrangles of the United States Geological Survey maps.

Fossil content 
Various fossils have been found in the Ponce Limestone: molds of gastropods, pelecypods, coral heads, and large foraminifera are indicative of deposition in shallow-water lagoon and back-reef environments. The large foraminifera, Lepidocyclina undosa and the ahermatypic “deep sea” coral Flabellum are reported within the Ponce Limestone.

See also

 List of fossiliferous stratigraphic units in Puerto Rico
 Caliche

References

External links
 Geology and Hydrogeology of the Caribbean Islands Aquifer System of the Commonwealth of Puerto Rico and the U.S. Virgin Islands: Regional Aquifer-System Analysis. ROBERT A. RENKEN, W.C. WARD, I.P. GILL, FERNANDO GÓMEZ-GÓMEZ, JESÚS RODRÍGUEZ-MARTÍNEZ, et al. USGS. Professional Paper 1419. Reston, Virginia. 2002. Accessed 13 November 2019.
 Geologia del Distrito Ponce. G. J. Mitchell. Revista de Obras Publicas de Puerto Rico. Year VII. Issue 1. January 1930. Pages 7–9. Accessed 1 August 2020.

Further reading
 Monroe, W.H., 1972, Geology of the middle Tertiary rocks in the Ponce-Guanica area—a progress report: U.S. Geological Survey Open-File Report 72-258, Washington, D.C., scale 1:20,000.
 USGS Pub ofr72258.
 Volckmann, R.P., 1984a, Geologic map of the Cabo Rojo and Parguera quadrangles, southwest Puerto Rico: U.S. Geological Survey Miscellaneous Investigations Series Map I-1557, scale 1:20,000.
 USGS Pub i1557.
 Volckmann, R.P., 1984b, Geologic map of the Puerto Real quadrangle, southwest Puerto Rico: U.S. Geological Survey Miscellaneous Investigations Series Map I-1559, scale 1:20,000.
 USGS Pub i1559.
 Krushensky and Monroe, 1975
 Krushensky and Monroe, 1978
 Krushensky and Monroe, 1979
 Mattson and Glover, 1973
 Monroe, W.H., 1973b

Limestone formations
Neogene Puerto Rico
Geography of Ponce, Puerto Rico
Geologic formations of Puerto Rico
Geologic formations of the Caribbean